Kameňany is a village and municipality in Revúca District in the Banská Bystrica Region of Slovakia.

Genealogical resources

The records for genealogical research are available at the state archive "Statny Archiv in Kosice, Slovakia"

 Roman Catholic church records (births/marriages/deaths): 1731-1900 (parish B)
 Lutheran church records (births/marriages/deaths): 1758-1895 (parish A)

See also
 List of municipalities and towns in Slovakia

References

External links
 
Surnames of living people in Kamenany

Villages and municipalities in Revúca District